State Route 763 (SR 763) is north–south state highway in the southern portion of the U.S. state of Ohio.

Route description
The entirety of SR 763 is located in the southeastern quadrant of Brown County.  SR 763 is not a part of the National Highway System, a network of highways deemed most important for the economy, mobility and defense of the nation.

History
SR 763 first appeared in 1937.  Its original routing is the same as that which it utilizes today through southeastern Brown County.  No changes of major significance have taken place to the state highway since its designation.

Major intersections

References

763
Transportation in Brown County, Ohio